What Fun We Were Having: 4 Stories About Date Rape is a 2011 American psychological drama anthology film directed by Adam Wingard and written by Wingard, Simon Barrett and E. L. Katz.  It stars Hannah Hughes, AJ Bowen, Lane Hughes, Brandon Carroll, and Amanda Crawford. It premiered at the Fantasia Festival in 2011, but did not go on to receive a commercial release.

Plot
The film consists of four segments, entitled "Hot Boys", "The Sleep Creep", "The Meat Man" and "Silver Bullets". Each segment obliquely dramatizes an incident of sexual assault, and the four stories take place in the same small American town on four different holidays: Halloween, Thanksgiving, Christmas and Valentine's Day.

Reception 
Dread Central gave the film 4 1/2 out of 5 blades, writing that "By shifting the focus away from the violent, physical aspects of rape, Wingard breathes shades of ambiguity into his characters while saying something very deep about the nature of intimacy, treading into deeper, darker territory than the usual predator and victim clichés." JoBlo.com's Arrow in the Head noted that the stories in the film were either hit or miss, something that they stated was common with anthology films, and that the anthology was overall "an avant-garde work, which should come as no surprise coming from Adam Wingard, who's quickly establishing himself as a micro-budget David Lynch between this, and his work on A Horrible Way to Die & Pop Skull."

References

External links

2011 films
2010s Christmas drama films
2010s psychological drama films
American anthology films
American Christmas drama films
Films directed by Adam Wingard
Films with screenplays by Simon Barrett (filmmaker)
American films about Halloween
Films about sex crimes
Films set in the United States
Thanksgiving in films
Valentine's Day in films
Films with screenplays by Adam Wingard
2010s English-language films
2010s American films